Odesa Passage is a shopping arcade and a hotel on Derybasivska Street in the centre of Odesa. It has 4 floors. On the ground floor there are many boutiques and on other 3 floors there is a hotel. Odesa Passage was built at the end of the 19th century and was the best hotel in Southern Russian Empire until the Bristol Hotel was opened.

The inside and exterior of the Passage building are decorated by numerous sculptures. The Passage houses multiple shops, restaurants, offices and the economy hotel “Passage”. Passage is the most picturesque market of Odesa.

Sources

 https://web.archive.org/web/20090706051032/http://www.passage.odessa.ua/index.html

Hotels in Odesa
Derybasivska Street
Victorian architecture in Ukraine
Shopping arcades